Khiaran (also Romanized as Khīārān and Kheyārān; also known as Ḩīārān) is a village in Sarab Rural District, in the Central District of Sonqor County, Kermanshah Province, Iran. At the 2006 census, its population was 307, in 67 families.

References 

Populated places in Sonqor County